L28 may refer to:
 60S ribosomal protein L28
 Hanomag L 28, a German truck
 Helio L-28 Courier, an American utility aircraft
 , a destroyer of the Royal Navy
 , a sloop of the Royal Navy
 Mitochondrial ribosomal protein L28
 Nissan L28 engine, an automobile engine
 NRO L-28, an American signals intelligence satellite